Emphytoeciini is a tribe of longhorn beetles of the subfamily Lamiinae. It was described by Lacordaire in 1872.

Taxonomy
 Emphytoecia Fairmaire & Germain, 1859
 Itheum Pascoe, 1864

References

Lamiinae